Laurent Dauphin (born March 27, 1995) is a Canadian professional ice hockey forward currently playing for the  Arizona Coyotes of the National Hockey League (NHL). He was drafted 39th overall by the Coyotes in the 2013 NHL Entry Draft.

Playing career
As a youth, Dauphin played in the 2007 Quebec International Pee-Wee Hockey Tournament with a minor ice hockey team from Lanaudière Ouest. He later played with the Collège Esther-Blondin Phénix of the Ligue de hockey Midget AAA du Québec (QMAAA), where he became the first player in franchise history to record 100 points. He later played three seasons of major junior hockey with the Chicoutimi Saguenéens of the Quebec Major Junior Hockey League.

Dauphin made his NHL debut during the 2015–16 season, on December 29, 2015, and scored his first career NHL goal against the Vancouver Canucks on 4 January 2016. He was re-assigned to the American Hockey League the following day.

On June 23, 2017, Dauphin was traded by Arizona at the 2017 NHL Entry Draft, alongside Connor Murphy to the Chicago Blackhawks in exchange for Niklas Hjalmarsson.

In the following 2017–18 season, after attending the Blackhawks training camp and pre-season, Dauphin was re-assigned to AHL affiliate, the Rockford IceHogs. Less than one year after being traded to Chicago, he was traded back to the Coyotes, alongside Richard Panik, in exchange for Anthony Duclair and Adam Clendening.

Dauphin began the 2018–19 season, serving as an Alternate captain for his third season with the Coyotes' affiliate the Tucson Roadrunners. He added 20 points in 34 games for the Roadrunners and made 1 appearance with the Coyotes on January 10, 2019, against the Vancouver Canucks,  before he was traded away for a second time by the Coyotes, along with Adam Helewka, to the Nashville Predators in exchange for Emil Pettersson on February 8, 2019. While with AHL affiliate, the Milwaukee Admirals, Dauphin was signed to a one-year, two-way contract extension with the Predators on February 27, 2019.

Continuing with the Milwaukee Admirals in the 2019–20 season, Dauphin added seven goals and 16 points in 33 games before he was traded by the Predators to the Montreal Canadiens in exchange for Michael McCarron on January 7, 2020. On June 21, 2021, Dauphin was re-signed to a one-year, two-way contract by the Canadiens. The subsequent 2021–22 season would see Dauphin get his most substantial opportunities in the NHL since 2017, as the injury-depleted Canadiens called him up for long periods when other centremen were sidelined. On March 9, 2022 he played a career-high twenty-fifth game in an NHL season, and remarked "playing for the Canadiens has always been a dream, and along with coming back to the National League, it’s like a two-for-one in my eyes."

Dauphin returned as a free agent for a third stint with the Arizona Coyotes, signing a one-year, two-way contract on July 13, 2022.

Career statistics

Regular season and playoffs

International

References

External links
 

1995 births
Living people
Arizona Coyotes draft picks
Arizona Coyotes players
Canadian ice hockey centres
Chicoutimi Saguenéens (QMJHL) players
Ice hockey people from Quebec
Laval Rocket players
Milwaukee Admirals players
Montreal Canadiens players
People from Repentigny, Quebec
Portland Pirates players
Rockford IceHogs (AHL) players
Springfield Falcons players
Tucson Roadrunners players